Jackie Terry (born 29 May 1954) is a Canadian sports shooter. She competed in the women's 10 metre air rifle event at the 1984 Summer Olympics.

References

External links
 

1954 births
Living people
Canadian female sport shooters
Olympic shooters of Canada
Shooters at the 1984 Summer Olympics
Sportspeople from Owen Sound
Pan American Games medalists in shooting
Pan American Games silver medalists for Canada
Shooters at the 1983 Pan American Games
20th-century Canadian women